Astafjord is a former municipality in the old Troms county, Norway.  The  municipality existed from 1926 until its dissolution in 1964.  It was located in the eastern part of the present-day municipality of Tjeldsund in Troms og Finnmark county.  The municipality surrounded the Grovfjorden.  The administrative center of the former municipality was the village of Grov where Astafjord Church is located.  The Astafjorden (strait) flowed along the northern part of the municipality and it was the namesake for the municipality.

History
Historically, Astafjord was a prestegjeld that encompassed a large part of southern Troms county, including the present-day municipalities of Bardu, Gratangen, Ibestad, Lavangen, Salangen, and most of Skånland.  When municipalities were created in Norway in 1838, the old parish was created as Ibestad Municipality (see formannskapsdistrikt).

The municipality of Astafjord was established on 1 July 1926 when the large Ibestad Municipality was separated into four municipalities:  Ibestad (population: 1,768), Andørja (population: 1,420), Astafjord (population: 1,018), and Gratangen (population: 1,967).  During the 1960s, there were many municipal mergers across Norway due to the work of the Schei Committee. On 1 January 1964, Astafjord (population: 1,120) was merged with the part of Skånland municipality on the mainland (population: 2,246) to create a new larger Skånland Municipality (the rest of the old Skånland on the island of Rolla joined Ibestad Municipality).

Name
The municipality was named after the Astafjorden strait which was named after the old Ånstad farm. The first element of the old name comes from the male name Arna or "Arne", the second element  means "home" or "farm", and the last element  is identical with the word for "fjord". Thus, the name literally means the "fjord by Arne's farm".

Government
While it existed, this municipality was responsible for primary education (through 10th grade), outpatient health services, senior citizen services, unemployment, social services, zoning, economic development, and municipal roads. During its existence, this municipality was governed by a municipal council of elected representatives, which in turn elected a mayor.

Municipal council
The municipal council  of Astafjord was made up of 15 representatives that were elected to four year terms.  The party breakdown of the council was as follows:

Mayors
The mayors of Astafjord:

1926-1929: Martin Rasmussen
1929-1932: Viggo Tande
1933-1942: Hartvik Nilsen
1945-1945: Viggo Tande
1945-1945: Peder Dyrstad
1946-1963: Peder Ellefsen

See also
List of former municipalities of Norway

References

External links

Former municipalities of Norway
Skånland
Populated places established in 1926
Populated places disestablished in 1964
1926 establishments in Norway
1964 disestablishments in Norway